The Schubart-Literaturpreis is a Germany literary prize donated by the city of Aalen since 1956 in honor of the 18th-century poet Christian Friedrich Daniel Schubart. It is one of the oldest literary awards of Baden-Württemberg.

The main prize, which is 15,000 euros as of 2015 (: €20,000), is presented every two years on Schubart's birthday to German-language writers whose literary or journalistic achievement "is in the tradition of the liberal and enlightened thought of Daniel Schubart." A runner-up prize (called Förderpreis) of 5,000 euros (: €7,000) has also presented since 2011.

Past winners
 1956: Hugo Theurer, Eduard Thom
 1958: no award
 1960: Paul Wanner, Ernst Häußinger, Bernhard Hildebrand
 1962: no award
 1964: Heinz Rainer Reinhardt, Konrad Winkler, Wilhelm Koch, Kurt Hermann Seidel
 1966: no award
 1968: Michael Mann, Hartmann Ulmschneider
 1970: no award
 1972: Peter Lahnstein, Josef W. Janker
 1974: Peter Härtling, Ernst R. Hauschka, Rolf Hellmut Foerster
 
 1976: Dieter Narr, Margarete Hannsmann
 1978: Richard Schmid, Horst Brandstätter, Georg Holzwarth
 1980: Reinhard Siegert, Werner Dürrson, Roland Lang
 1982: Otto Borst, Hartmut Müller, Peter Spranger
 1984: Gerhard Storz, Walther Dürr, Dieter Wieland
 1986: Kurt Honolka, Hartmut Geerken
 1989: Eveline Hasler, Dieter Schlesak, Jürgen Walter
 1991: Hermann Glaser, Karlheinz Bauer, Helmut Pfisterer
 1993: Thomas Rosenlöcher, Henrike Leonhardt, Axel Kuhn
 1995: Ralph Giordano, Hermann Baumhauer
 1997: Alice Schwarzer
 1999: Gabriele Goettle, Hellmut G. Haasis
 2001: Robert Gernhardt, Hartmut Schick
 2003: Uwe Timm
 2005: Henryk M. Broder
 2007: Friedrich Christian Delius
 2009: Peter Schneider
 2011: Hans Christoph Buch, Förderpreis: Timo Brunke, Sonderpreis: Bernd Jürgen Warneken
 2013: Jenny Erpenbeck, Förderpreis: Patricia Görg
 2015: Katja Petrowskaja, Förderpreis: Karen Köhler
 2017: Saša Stanišić, Förderpreis: Isabelle Lehn
 2019: Daniel Kehlmann for Tyll, Förderpreis: Nora Krug for Heimat: Ein deutsches Familienalbum
 2021: Monika Helfer for Die Bagage, Förderpreis: Verena Güntner for Power

References

External links
 

German literary awards